Musa may refer to:

Places
Mūša, a river in Lithuania and Latvia
Musa, Azerbaijan, a village in Yardymli Rayon
Musa, Iran, a village in Ilam Province
Musa, Chaharmahal and Bakhtiari, Iran
Musa, Kerman, Iran
Musa, Bukan, West Azerbaijan Province, Iran
Musa, Maku, West Azerbaijan Province, Iran
Musa, Pakistan, a village in Chhachh, Attock, Punjab, Pakistan
Musa (crater), an impact crater on Saturn's moon Enceladus
Musa (Tanzanian ward), a ward in Tanzania
Abu Musa, an island in the Persian Gulf
Musa Dagh a mountain peak in Turkey
Jebel Musa (Morocco), a mountain known as one of the pillars of Hercules
 Jabal Musa, or Mount Sinai, a mountain in the Sinai Desert believed to be a possible location of the Biblical Mount Sinai
 Muza Emporion, an ancient port city near present day Mocha, Yemen

People
 Musa (name), including a list of people with the surname and given name
 Moses in Islam
 Musa I of Mali, emperor of the Mali Empire 1312–37
 Musa of Parthia, queen of the Parthian Empire 2 BC to 4 AD
 Musa Sor, a Yazidi saint

Fictional characters

 Musa, in the story "The City of Brass" in The Book of One Thousand and One Nights
 Musa, one of the main characters in Winx Club
 Musa, subject of the 2015 short story of that name by Kamel Daoud

Acronyms
Massey University Students' Associations Federation, several student organizations in New Zealand
Musicians Union of South Africa, trade union
Accademia Nazionale di Santa Cecilia Musical Instruments Museum, museum in Rome, Italy
Made in USA, registered label by the Federal Trade Commission
Multiple Unit Steerable Array, a type of antenna giving Musa connector its name 
Music of the United States of America (publications), series of critical editions of music
MuSa, Musan Salama, a Finnish football club
Museo Subacuático de Art, in English,  Cancún Underwater Museum

Other uses
 Müsa, an Italian bagpipe
 MUSA's, an Argentinian band
 Musa (album), a 2012 album by Ivy Queen
 Musa (film), a 2001 South Korean epic film
 Musa (genus), one of three genera in the family Musaceae that includes bananas and plantains
 Musa (horse), Thoroughbred mare and winner of 1899 Oaks Stakes.
 Musa connector, a type of coaxial connector used in the telecommunications and video industries
 Lancia Musa, an Italian car by Lancia
 600 Musa, an asteroid

See also
 MUSA (disambiguation)
 Moosa, a given name and surname
 Moosa (India), a village in Mansa, Punjab, India
 Mount Musa (disambiguation)
 Moussa (name)
 Musar (disambiguation)